The Joppa Iron Works, also known as Patterson's Iron Works was founded around 1817 by Joseph and Edward Patterson of Baltimore, the brothers of Elizabeth Patterson Bonaparte, the sister-in-law of Napoleon I of France.

Built at the falls-line of the (Dividing line of the Coastal Plain, the Piedmont Plateau) Big Gunpowder River in eastern Baltimore County, Maryland, the plant was started as a slitting and nail-making company. Located about 0.75 mile below current-day Maryland Route 7, it eventually had six puddling furnaces, one heating furnace, and 37 water-powered nail machines. 

The Joppa Iron Works closed around 1865 with the death of Edward Patterson. The Loreley Distilling Company eventually purchased the property and distilled whiskey on the site, closing when Prohibition took effect; selling the property to the Frank L. Wight Distilling Co. in 1933. Frank Wight sold the company to Hiram Walker & Sons of Canada in 1941. The site was subsequently shut down in 1948 when production moved to their Peoria, Illinois, facility.

Few remnants of the iron works that remain; a mill race and some stone foundations are still visible. Iron bolts and an old ship's mooring ring are still visible in various boulders. Remnants of slag from the furnaces can still be found in the area. In 1970, the property was acquired by the Department of Forest & Parks Maryland and is now part of the Gunpowder State Park.

External links

References

 McGrain, John W. (1985) "From Pig Iron to Cotton Duck, Volume 1." Towson, MD: Baltimore Co., pages 212-214.

Buildings and structures in Baltimore County, Maryland
Ironworks and steel mills in Maryland
Industrial buildings and structures in Maryland
1810s establishments in Maryland
Companies based in Maryland
Patterson family of Maryland